The United States Battle Fleet or Battle Force was part of the organization of the United States Navy from 1922 to 1941.

The General Order of 6 December 1922 organized the United States Fleet, with the Battle Fleet as the Pacific presence. This fleet comprised the main body of ships in the Navy, with the smaller Scouting Fleet as the Atlantic presence. The battleships, including most of the modern ones, and new aircraft carriers were assigned to the Battle Fleet.

Organization
On September 1, 1923, the Battle Fleet was under the command of Admiral Samuel S. Robison. Battleships, Battle Fleet was under the command of Vice Admiral Henry A. Wiley, with his flag aboard . Aircraft Squadrons, Battle Fleet, under Captain A. W. Marshall, comprised  (F), and the tender . Destroyer Squadrons, Battle Fleet, under Rear Admiral Sumner E. W. Kittelle, comprised Destroyer Squadron 11 and Destroyer Squadron 12. Submarine Divisions, Pacific, was under Captain A. Bronson, Jr.

In 1930, the name of the fleet was changed to "Battle Force", but the structure remained the same. In 1931, the force was based in Pearl Harbor and consisted of a majority of the United States' surface fleet: all of the newer battleships, all of the carriers, a light cruiser squadron and "three or four" destroyer squadrons were all a part of the Battle Force. In 1939, the Battle Force had five aircraft carriers, 12 battleships, 14 light cruisers, and 68 destroyers.

On 1 February 1941, General Order 143 reorganized the United States Fleet with three separate fleets, the United States Atlantic Fleet, the United States Pacific Fleet and the Asiatic Fleet.

Commander in Chief, Battle Fleet (COMBATFLT)

Commander Battle Force (COMBATFOR)

References

Bibliography 

Fleets of the United States Navy